Larry Clemmons (November 25, 1906 – July 22, 1988) was an American animator, screenwriter and voice actor who was a writer for Bing Crosby on his various radio programs and one of the original animators for The Walt Disney Company.

Career

Clemmons graduated with a degree in architecture from University of Michigan but couldn't find work due to the effects of the Great Depression. So, desperate for work in any area he could find it, he accepted a job offer from Walt Disney in 1930 to work at his Hyperion Studios. After several years at Hyperion, he became an assistant animator for the Mickey Mouse film series.

When World War II happened, Larry left the studio and decamped to the Midwest, where he wrote technical manuals for wartime manufacturing plants.

Clemmons then freelanced in radio, and at the end of the war, landed a job on Bing Crosby’s prime-time network radio shows, where he spent nine years writing weekly scripts for Crosby and assorted guest stars. When the radio gig ended, he returned to Walt Disney Productions as a writer and segment producer on The Mickey Mouse Club. After finishing this assignment, he wrote Disney’s spoken intros for the television show entitled Walt Disney’s Wonderful World of Color. Clemmons retired in 1978.

Filmography

As writer

As animator

References

1906 births
1988 deaths
Animation screenwriters
Taubman College of Architecture and Urban Planning alumni
People from Chicago
People from Friday Harbor, Washington
Walt Disney Animation Studios people
20th-century American screenwriters